In mathematics and functional analysis a direct integral or Hilbert integral is a generalization of the concept of direct sum. The theory is most developed for direct integrals of Hilbert spaces and direct integrals of von Neumann algebras. The concept was introduced in 1949 by John von Neumann in one of the papers in the series On Rings of Operators. One of von Neumann's goals in this paper was to reduce the classification of (what are now called) von Neumann algebras on separable Hilbert spaces to the classification of so-called factors. Factors are analogous to full matrix algebras over a field, and von Neumann wanted to prove a continuous analogue of the Artin–Wedderburn theorem classifying semi-simple rings.

Results on direct integrals can be viewed as generalizations of results about finite-dimensional C*-algebras of matrices; in this case the results are easy to prove directly. The infinite-dimensional case is complicated by measure-theoretic technicalities.

Direct integral theory was also used by George Mackey in his analysis of systems of imprimitivity and his general theory of induced representations of locally compact separable groups.

Direct integrals of Hilbert spaces 
The simplest example of a direct integral are the L2 spaces associated to a (σ-finite) countably additive measure μ on a measurable space X. Somewhat more generally one can consider a separable Hilbert space H and the space of square-integrable H-valued functions

Terminological note: The terminology adopted by the literature on the subject is followed here, according to which a measurable space X is referred to as a Borel space and the elements of the distinguished σ-algebra of X as Borel sets, regardless of whether or not the underlying σ-algebra comes from a topological space (in most examples it does). A Borel space is standard if and only if it is isomorphic to the underlying Borel space of a Polish space; all Polish spaces of a given cardinality are isomorphic to each other (as Borel spaces). Given a countably additive measure μ on X, a measurable set is one that differs from a Borel set by a null set.  The measure μ on X is a standard measure if and only if there is a null set E such that its complement X − E is a standard Borel space. All measures considered here are σ-finite.

Definition. Let X be a Borel space equipped with a countably additive measure μ. A measurable family of Hilbert spaces on (X, μ) is a family {Hx}x∈ X, which is locally equivalent to a trivial family in the following sense: There is a countable partition

by measurable subsets of X such that

where Hn is the canonical n-dimensional Hilbert space, that is

 

A cross-section of {Hx}x∈ X is a family {sx}x ∈ X such that sx ∈ Hx for all x ∈ X. A cross-section is measurable if and only if its restriction to each partition element Xn is measurable. We will identify measurable cross-sections s, t that are equal almost everywhere. Given a measurable family of Hilbert spaces, the direct integral

consists of equivalence classes (with respect to almost everywhere equality) of measurable square integrable cross-sections of {Hx}x∈ X. This is a Hilbert space under the inner product

Given the local nature of our definition, many definitions applicable to single Hilbert spaces apply to measurable families of Hilbert spaces as well.

Remark. This definition is apparently more restrictive than the one given by von Neumann and discussed in Dixmier's classic treatise on von Neumann algebras. In the more general definition, the Hilbert space fibers Hx are allowed to vary from point to point without having a local triviality requirement (local in a measure-theoretic sense). One of the main theorems of the von Neumann theory is to show that in fact the more general definition is equivalent to the simpler one given here.

Note that the direct integral of a measurable family of Hilbert spaces depends only on the measure class of the measure μ; more precisely:

Theorem. Suppose μ, ν are σ-finite countably additive measures on X that have the same sets of measure 0. Then the mapping

is a unitary operator

Example 

Technically the simplest examples are when X is a countable set and μ is a discrete measure. Throughout the article, we will consider the following running example in which X = N and μ is counting measure on N. In this case any sequence {Hk} of separable Hilbert spaces can be considered as a measurable family. Moreover,

Decomposable operators 

In our running example, any bounded linear operator T on

 

is given by an infinite matrix

Consider operators that are block diagonal, that is all entries off the diagonal are zero. We call these operators decomposable. These operators can be characterized as those that commute with diagonal matrices:

We now proceed to the general definition: A family of bounded operators {Tx}x∈ X with Tx ∈ L(Hx) is said to be strongly measurable if and only if its restriction to each Xn is strongly measurable. This makes sense because Hx is constant on Xn.

Measurable families of operators with an essentially bounded norm, that is

define bounded linear operators

acting in a pointwise fashion, that is

Such operators are said to be decomposable.

Examples of decomposable operators are those defined by scalar-valued (i.e. C-valued) measurable functions λ on X. In fact,

Theorem. The mapping

 

given by

is an involutive algebraic isomorphism onto its image.

For this reason we will identify L∞μ(X) with the image of φ.

Theorem Decomposable operators are precisely those that are in the operator commutant of the abelian algebra L∞μ(X).

Decomposition of Abelian von Neumann algebras 

The spectral theorem has many variants. A particularly powerful version is as follows:

Theorem. For any Abelian von Neumann algebra A on a separable Hilbert space H, there is a standard Borel space X and a measure μ on X such that it is unitarily equivalent as an operator algebra to L∞μ(X) acting on a direct integral of Hilbert spaces

 

To assert A is unitarily equivalent to L∞μ(X) as an operator algebra means that there is a unitary

such that U A U* is the algebra of diagonal operators L∞μ(X). Note that this asserts more than just the algebraic equivalence of A with the algebra of diagonal operators.

This version however does not explicitly state how the underlying standard Borel space X is obtained. There is a uniqueness result for the above decomposition.

Theorem. If the Abelian von Neumann algebra A is unitarily equivalent to both L∞μ(X) and L∞ν(Y) acting on the direct integral spaces

 

and μ, ν are standard measures, then there is a Borel isomorphism

where E, F are null sets such that

φ is a measure class isomorphism, that is φ and its inverse preserve sets of measure 0.

This previous two theorems provide the complete classification of Abelian von Neumann algebras on separable Hilbert spaces. Note that this classification actually takes into account the realization of the von Neumann algebra as an algebra of operators. If we only consider the underlying von Neumann algebra independently of its realization as a von Neumann algebra, then its structure is determined by very simple measure-theoretic invariants.

Direct integrals of von Neumann algebras 

Let {Hx}x ∈ X be a measurable family of Hilbert spaces. A family of von Neumann algebras {Ax}x ∈ X
with

is measurable if and only if there is a countable set D of measurable operator families that pointwise generate {Ax} x ∈ X as a von Neumann algebra in the following sense: For almost all x ∈ X,

where W*(S) denotes the von Neumann algebra generated by the set S. If {Ax}x ∈ X is a measurable family of von Neumann algebras, the direct integral of von Neumann algebras

consists of all operators of the form

for Tx ∈ Ax.

One of the main theorems of von Neumann and Murray in their original series of papers is a proof of the decomposition theorem: Any von Neumann algebra is a direct integral of factors. We state this precisely below.

Theorem. If {Ax}x ∈ X is a measurable family of von Neumann algebras and μ is standard, then the family of operator commutants is also measurable and

Central decomposition 

Suppose A is a von Neumann algebra. let Z(A) be the center of A, that is the set of operators in A that commute with all operators A, that is

Z(A) is an Abelian von Neumann algebra.

Example. The center of L(H) is 1-dimensional. In general, if A is a von Neumann algebra, if the center is 1-dimensional we say A is a factor.

Now suppose A is a von Neumann algebra whose center contains a sequence of minimal pairwise orthogonal non-zero projections {Ei}i ∈ N such that

Then A Ei is a von Neumann algebra on the range Hi of Ei. It is easy to see A Ei is a factor. Thus in this special case

represents A as a direct sum of factors.  This is a special case of the central decomposition theorem of von Neumann.

In general, we can apply the structure theorem of Abelian von Neumann algebras that represents Z(A) as an algebra of scalar diagonal operators. In any such representation, all the operators in A are decomposable operators. In fact, we can use this to prove the basic result of von Neumann that any von Neumann algebra admits a decomposition into factors.

Theorem. Suppose

is a direct integral decomposition of H and A is a von Neumann algebra on H so that Z(A) is represented by the algebra of scalar diagonal operators L∞μ(X) where X is a standard Borel space. Then

where for almost all x ∈ X, Ax is a von Neumann algebra that is a factor.

Measurable families of representations 

If A is a separable C*-algebra, we can consider measurable families of non-degenerate *-representations of A; recall that in case A has a unit, non-degeneracy is equivalent to unit-preserving. By the general correspondence that exists between strongly continuous unitary representations of a locally compact group G and non-degenerate *-representations of the groups C*-algebra C*(G), the theory for C*-algebras immediately provides a decomposition theory for representations of separable locally compact groups.

Theorem. Let A be a separable C*-algebra and π a non-degenerate involutive representation of A on a separable Hilbert space H. Let W*(π) be the von Neumann algebra generated by the operators π(a) for a ∈ A. Then corresponding to any central decomposition of W*(π) over a standard measure space (X, μ) (which as stated is unique in a measure theoretic sense), there is a measurable family of factor representations

of A such that

Moreover, there is a subset N of X with μ measure zero, such that πx, πy are disjoint whenever x, y ∈ X − N, where representations are said to be disjoint if and only if there are no intertwining operators between them.

One can show that the direct integral can be indexed on the so-called quasi-spectrum Q of A, consisting of quasi-equivalence classes of factor representations of A. 
Thus there is a standard measure μ on Q and a measurable family of factor representations indexed on Q such that πx belongs to the class of x. This decomposition is essentially unique. This result is fundamental in the theory of group representations.

References

 J. Dixmier,  Von Neumann algebras, 
 J. Dixmier, C* algebras 
 G. W. Mackey, The Theory of Unitary Group Representations, The University of Chicago Press, 1976.
 J. von Neumann, On Rings of Operators. Reduction Theory The Annals of Mathematics 2nd Ser., Vol. 50, No. 2 (Apr., 1949), pp. 401–485.
 Masamichi Takesaki ''Theory of Operator Algebras I, II, III", encyclopedia of mathematical sciences, Springer-Verlag, 2001–2003 (the first volume was published 1979 in 1. Edition) 

Functional analysis
Measure theory
Von Neumann algebras